Father Yermo Schools is a private, Roman Catholic 3K-12 school in El Paso, Texas. It is located in the Roman Catholic Diocese of El Paso. It is named after José Maria de Yermo y Parres.

It has separate facilities for elementary and secondary school, and a separate headquarters.

Notes and references

External links
 

Catholic secondary schools in Texas
Catholic elementary schools in Texas
Educational institutions established in 1960
High schools in El Paso, Texas
Schools in El Paso County, Texas
Private K-12 schools in Texas
1960 establishments in Texas